Bruno Moraes is a given name. It may refer to:

 Bruno Moraes (footballer, born 1984), Brazilian football striker for Canidelo
 Bruno Moraes (footballer, born 1989), Brazilian football forward for Pouso Alegre

See also
 Bruno Morais (born 1998), Brazilian football defender